Coconino may refer to:

Coconino Community College
Coconino County, Arizona
Coconino High School
Coconino National Forest
Coconino Plateau
Coconino Sandstone
USS Coconino County (LST-603)